109th Signal Squadron, Royal Australian Corps of Signals is a military communications sub-unit of the Australian Army. Under command of the 8th Signal Regiment, it currently resides in Karrakatta in Western Australia in support of the 13th Brigade.

History 
Signals have been represented in Western Australia since 1906 when a company of Signallers was formed and located in Perth and Fremantle. The Corps units in Western Australia have undergone many name changes since 1906. After becoming the Royal Australian Corps of Signals in 1925 and serving during the Second World War only two main units were left operating in Western Australia; Headquarters Western Command Signal Squadron and Western Command Intercom Troop.

405th Signal Squadron was raised from these two units and a Battle Group Signal Troop was raised to cater for other Western Command units. 405 Signal Troop was primarily responsible for all strategic communications between Western Command and other States/Formations.

A further change in 1965 saw the raising of 123 Signal Squadron from 405 Signal Squadron. On 12 November 1966, 109th Signal Squadron was raised from the Battle Group Signal Troop to assist in the training of National Servicemen and women. Both units were in Leederville, Western Australia. In 1973, all Army Reserve members were transferred from 123 Signal Squadron to 109 Signal Squadron. 109 Signal Squadron was responsible for providing communications to 2 Task Force.

109th Signal Squadron moved to Lord Street in East Perth in 1974 and remained there until 1987. Early in 1988, the unit moved to Leeuwin Barracks, East Fremantle, and came under the command of Headquarters 13 Brigade.

A Significant change occurred to 109th Signal Squadron’s establishment during 1989 as a result of becoming a Brigade Signal Squadron. Although an independent Signal Squadron, it now had a formation chain of command, Headquarters 13 Brigade. Its establishment was changed to be along the lines of an Australian Regular Army Brigade Signal Squadron. In the five years following the unit undertook seven major exercises in the Pilbara region.

109th Signal Squadron moved to its current location in 1992 where most of the 13 Brigade units are located. In 2006 under Project Focus, all supporting non-Royal Australian Corps of Signals elements, excluding limited logistic staff were reallocated to dedicated corps units as part of a project designed to enhance and streamline C2 and administrative arrangements.

In 2021, the Squadron was transferred to under command of the 8th Signal Regiment.

Since 2006, 109th Signal Squadron has consisted of two troops (named in 2008 to honour the Western Australian signals history): 123 Signal Troop - Battlefield Communications focused; and 405 Signal Troop - Battlefield Telecommunications Network/Information Systems focused.

109th Signal Squadron has committed reservists to undertake rotations to the Solomon Islands for Operation Anode, providing support to border patrolling in Northwest Western Australia for Operation Resolute and providing individual round outs to Operation Slipper in Afghanistan and Operation Astute in East Timor.

References

Military units and formations established in 1966
Military communications units and formations
Company sized units of the Australian Army
Combat support units and formations of the Australian Army
Military communications of Australia